Gary Faulkner Jr. (born October 18, 1990) is an American ten-pin bowler from Memphis, Tennessee. He competes on the PBA Tour after having been a member of Junior Team USA. He won his first major PBA title in 2015.

Background 
Faulkner grew up in Whitehaven and Germantown (in and near Memphis, Tennessee) and is a 2009 graduate of Germantown High School. He learned to bowl at Winchester Bowl and the Strike Zone Bowling Lanes in Memphis, where he earned the nickname “300”. His father, Gary Faulkner Sr., is pastor at Cummings Street Missionary Baptist Church in Southeast Memphis.

Amateur career
Faulkner entered the TNBA (The National Bowling Association) Junior Bowling Program at age 5, eventually mentoring other youth bowlers. He won the Junior Gold Championship in 2011 and earned a spot on Junior Team USA. He attended Webber International University, where in 2012 he anchored the men's team to Intercollegiate Team Championship win, and was 2013 ITC men's most valuable player. He is a TNBA Veronica L. Green Junior Singles Scratch Tournament Masters titlist.

Professional bowling career
Faulkner joined the PBA in 2013, and, in his first professional television appearance, in 2015 he won a major title at the Rolltech PBA World Championship. In 2016 he finished ninth in the PBA Xtra Frame Lubbock Sports Open.

Faulkner became the second PBA Tour African-American champion, after now-retired tour winner George Branham III. In recognition, Tennessee Representative Steve Cohen invited Faulkner to bowl at the White House, where on March 4, 2016 he bowled on the lanes beneath the adjacent Eisenhower Executive Office Building with some members of his family, of Cohen's staff, of White House staff, and Cohen himself.

Recognition from the United States Congress

PBA Tour wins
2015 – Rolltech PBA World Championship (Reno, Nevada)

Personal
Faulkner has a bachelor's degree in computer information systems from Webber International University, and enjoys computer programming, working out, and basketball.

References

External links
 Faulkner's Profile at PBA.com
 Faulkner "Bowler" page on Facebook
 Recognizing and Congratulating Gary Faulkner Jr., United States Congressional Record, February 4, 2016

American ten-pin bowling players
Sportspeople from Memphis, Tennessee
1990 births
Living people
African-American sportsmen
Webber International University alumni
21st-century African-American sportspeople